William Coles Finch  (1864–1944) was a British historian and author of a number of books on Kent-related topics. He is best known for writing Watermills and Windmills, published in 1933 and reprinted in 1976, which is considered a standard work on the topic of Kent windmills.

Personal

William Coles Finch was born on 23 October, 1864 in Rochester, Kent. His wife was Emily, and they had four children, Vera, Dorothy, Irene and Neville. In 1908, his first book, Water, its origin and use, was published. This was followed in 1914 by Water in Nature, jointly authored with Ellison Hawks. In 1925, In Kentish Pilgrim Land was published, followed by The Lure of the Countryside in 1927, Life in Rural England in 1928 and Watermills in Windmills in 1933. The latter is considered a bible on windmills in Kent. Coles Finch died in Luton, Kent on 6 June 1944, aged 79. He is buried in the churchyard of St Nicholas Church, Rochester. In 1976, Watermills and Windmills was reprinted. BBC Radio Medway produced an hour-long documentary Sweeping Changes, The Windmills of Kent in response to the reprint.

Career
Coles Finch was the resident engineer of the Brompton, Chatham, Gillingham and Rochester Water Company. He had previously been engineer and manager of the Higham and Hundred of Hoo Water Company and assistant manager of Strood Waterworks. He lived at Waterworks House, Luton, Chatham. In 1897, Coles Finch read a paper at the British Association of Waterworks Engineers meeting at the Town Hall, Westminster, London on Electrical Water Level Recorders.

Published works

 (jointly authored with Ellison Hawks).

 (reprint)

 (reprint)

References

Sources

1864 births
1944 deaths
People from Chatham, Kent
English mechanical engineers
20th-century English historians
English male non-fiction writers
20th-century English male writers
19th-century British engineers
20th-century British engineers
English nature writers